A. flavus  may refer to:
 Aspergillus flavus, a fungus species
 Altererythrobacter flavus a bacterial species from the genus of Altererythrobacter
 Agromyces flavus a bacterial species from the genus of Agromyces
 Arthrobacter flavus a bacterial species from the genus of Arthrobacter
 Awaous flavus a fish species found in South America

See also
 Flavus (disambiguation)